The 1882 St. Louis Brown Stockings season was the first professional baseball season played by the team now known as the St. Louis Cardinals. The team was founded in the earlier St. Louis Brown Stockings franchise. It played in the National Association league in 1875 and in the National League from 1876 to 1877. After a scandal over game-fixing, combined with financial problems, the St Louis Brown Stockings left the National League but continued to play as an independent team from 1878 to 1881. Chris von der Ahe, a German immigrant, purchased the team prior to the 1882 season and joined the new American Association. The St. Louis Brown Stockings posted a 37-43 game record in their first season in the American Association, giving them fifth place. The team played at the Grand Avenue Grounds (which was later renamed Sportsman's Park) at the corner of Grand Avenue and Dodier Street in north St. Louis.

Building the team

Before the 1882 season, Von der Ahe secured a place for the team in the American Association and provided funds to bring players to St. Louis. Between 1882 and 1892, the team he built went on to win four American Association titles.

Al Spink, the team advisor, recommended Von der Ahe sign Charlie Comiskey. Comiskey, who later played with the Chicago White Sox, was a skilled, young, first baseman who had been playing in Dubuque, Iowa.

Ned Cuthbert was a former professional player in St. Louis. Although he had retired from baseball and worked as a bartender in St. Louis, Cuthbert remained prominent in the local baseball community. He had encouraged Von der Ahe to purchase the team. Von der Ahe hired Cuthbert to be his first captain, with all the duties of a field manager. Cuthbert used his experience to attract several players to St. Louis from the East.

Most of the first-year Browns originated in St. Louis, including brothers Jack and Bill Gleason, pitcher Jumbo McGinnis, outfielder George Seward, and catcher Tom Sullivan.

Regular season
In 1866, Gus Solari laid out a professional baseball field at Sportsman's Park, St Louis. Sixteen years later, on May 2, 1882, the opening day of the St. Louis Brown Stockings' 1882 season took place. Approximately 2,000 spectators watched the game for a fee of one quarter each. The team played numerous local teams in April exhibitions.

McGinnis was the first pitcher and he started 45 of the team's 80 games. Jack Gleason made the team's first hit. It was a lead off single in the first innings. He also scored the first run on Comiskey's three-base hit. The team won their first game with a score of 9 runs to 7. McGinnis contributed two doubles.

In late May 1882, the team was in a tie for first place in its six-team league. They were eight games over .500, putting them one game behind the Cincinnati Reds.  There followed a seven-week period when the team lost sixteen more games than they won. They could not contend for the championship.

During the season, more than 175,000 spectators attended the team's games. The favorite players on the team were Comiskey and McGinnis.

Season standings

Record vs. opponents

Roster

Player stats

Batting

Starters by position
Pos=Position, G=Games played, AB=At bats, R=Runs scored, H=Hits, 2B=Doubles, 3B=Triples, HR=Home runs, SB=Stolen bases, BB=Base on balls, Avg.=Batting average, Slg=Slugging percentage

Other batters
G=Games played, AB=At bats, R=Runs scored, H=Hits, 2B=Doubles, 3B=Triples, HR=Home runs, SB=Stolen bases, BB=Base on balls, Avg.=Batting average, Slg=Slugging percentage

Pitching

Starting pitchers
W=Wins, L=Losses, ERA=Earned run average, G=Games played, GS=Games started, CG=Complete games, IP=Innings pitched, H=Hits allowed, R=Runs allowed, ER=Earned runs allowed, HR=Home runs allowed, BB=Base on balls, SO=Strikeouts, WHIP=Walks plus hits per inning pitched

Other pitchers
W=Wins, L=Losses, ERA=Earned run average, G=Games played, GS=Games started, CG=Complete games, SV=Saves, IP=Innings pitched, H=Hits allowed, R=Runs allowed, ER=Earned runs allowed, HR=Home runs allowed, BB=Base on balls, SO=Strikeouts, WHIP=Walks plus hits per inning pitched

Relief pitchers
W=Wins, L=Losses, ERA=Earned run average, G=Games played, SV=Saves, IP=Innings pitched, H=Hits allowed, R=Runs allowed, ER=Earned runs allowed, HR=Home runs allowed, BB=Base on balls, SO=Strikeouts, WHIP=Walks plus hits per inning pitched

References

Saint Louis Brown Stockings season
St. Louis Cardinals seasons
1882 in sports in Missouri